Olkhovsky is a rural locality (a khutor) in Bolshebabinskoye Rural Settlement, Alexeyevsky District, Volgograd Oblast, Russia. The population was 59 as of 2010.

Geography 
The village is located 6 km north from Bolshoy Babinsky.

References 

Rural localities in Alexeyevsky District, Volgograd Oblast